Edward Shepherd (died 1747) was a prominent London-based English architect and developer in the Georgian period.

Architectural work 

Shepherd worked on the following projects, among others:

 Cannons, a house for James Brydges, 1st Duke of Chandos (1673–1744), in Middlesex (1723–25, now demolished).
 Houses in Cavendish Square, London (1724–28).
 Great Stanmore Rectory, Middlesex (1725).
 Houses in Brook Street, London (1725–29).
 Houses in St James's Square, London (1726–8), including No. 4, the Naval & Military Club and a former home of Nancy Astor from 1912 to 1942.
 Palace-fronted buildings for the 1st Duke of Chandos in Grosvenor Square, London (c1728–30, now demolished).
 Goodman's Fields Theatre, Ayliffe Street, Whitechapel, London (opened October 1732, demolished in 1746).
 Theatre Royal, Covent Garden in London; renamed the Royal Opera House in 1892 (the Shepherd-designed building opened December 1732, destroyed by fire 1808).
 Development of Shepherd Market and adjoining streets in Mayfair, London (1735–46).
 Houses in South Audley Street, Mayfair, London (1736–37).
 Work on De Grey Mausoleum, Church of St John the Baptist, Flitton, Bedfordshire (1739–40).

Unfortunately, much of Shepherd's architectural work has been demolished, but perhaps his greatest legacy of the eponymous Shepherd Market, which is now a highly desirable location.

External links 
 Shepherd Market, developed by Edward Shephard in 1735-46
 Edward Shepherd from Answers.com.
 The Development of the Estate 1720–1785: Architects and Builders. In F. H. W. Sheppard (editor), Survey of London: volume 39: The Grosvenor Estate in Mayfair, Part 1 (General History), pages 20–24, 1977.

1747 deaths
Architects from London
English theatre architects
British real estate businesspeople
Artists from London
Year of birth unknown
18th-century English architects